The 15th legislature of the French Fifth Republic was the French Parliament that was in office from 27 June 2017 (following the legislative elections on 11 and 18 June 2017) until 21 June 2022. The party of President Emmanuel Macron, La République En Marche! (LREM), obtained an absolute majority of 308 deputies, alongside its ally, the Democratic Movement (MoDem), which secured 42 seats. The newly-installed deputies elected François de Rugy as President of the National Assembly when the National Assembly first convened on 27 June. The legislative election saw a record level of renewal, with only a quarter of the deputies elected in 2012 also elected in 2017, as well as a significant increase in the representation of women and youth. With seven planned parliamentary groups, it would be the most fragmented National Assembly since 1958.

It was preceded by the 14th legislature and succeeded by the 16th legislature.

Composition of the executive 
 President of the French Republic: Emmanuel Macron (LREM), since 14 May 2017
 Prime Minister: Jean Castex (LREM), since 3 July 2020

Composition of the National Assembly 

A record number and proportion of women were elected in the legislative elections, with 224 in total representing 38.8% of the National Assembly. This was an 11.9 percentage point increase over the previous legislature in which 155 women were elected deputies, representing 26.9% of the composition.

The average age of deputies in the 15th legislature was also significantly lower than that of the previous, at 48 years and 240 days compared to the previous legislature at 53 years and 195 days. The number of deputies under 30 years old soared from 4 to 29, while the number from 30 to 49 years old increased from 197 to 271, and the number of deputies between 60 and 69 years old was halved from 171 to 87.

Higher professions continued to remain dominant in the assembly despite these changes.

The legislative elections also saw a massive degree of renewal, with only a quarter of deputies elected in 2012 being re-elected in 2017; of the 354 outgoing deputies who stood for re-election, only 148 won. A total of 429 deputies elected to the 15th legislature were not elected in 2012. The renewal can be explained in part by the large number of outgoing deputies who did not seek to retain their seat: 223 deputies, representing 39% of the assembly. Of the 354 who did present themselves, 125 were eliminated in the first round on 11 June, 81 were defeated in the second round, and 148 were re-elected.

Changes in composition 

Members of the National Assembly who join the government are required to give up their seats to their substitutes (suppléants) a month after their appointment, as stipulated in the constitution. Should ministers quit the government, they recover their seat in the National Assembly from their substitute a month after their resignation. By-elections are held in the event of the annulation of electoral results or vacancies caused by resignations (in most circumstances not those related to the death of a deputy, in which case the substitute takes the seat if possible), except within the year before legislative elections.

The appointment of the Philippe I government obligated several appointed ministers to give up their seats in the National Assembly to their substitutes: specifically, Minister of Economy and Finance Bruno Le Maire (Eure's 1st constituency) in favor of Séverine Gipson; Secretary of State for the Digital Sector Mounir Mahjoubi (Paris's 16th constituency) in favor of Delphine O; Minister for Europe and Foreign Affairs Marielle de Sarnez (Paris's 11th constituency) in favor of Maud Gatel; Minister of Territorial Cohesion Richard Ferrand (Finistère's 6th constituency) in favor of Lætitia Dolliou; Minister for Overseas France Annick Girardin (Saint-Pierre-et-Miquelon's 1st constituency) in favor of Stéphane Claireaux; and Secretary of State for Relations with Parliament and Government Spokesman Christophe Castaner (Alpes-de-Haute-Provence's 2nd constituency) in favor of Emmanuelle Fontaine-Domeizel. Following a reshuffle and the formation of the Philippe II government, Ferrand took his seat after his ephemeral ministerial tenure, as did de Sarnez after her departure from the government.

By-elections

Election of the President of the National Assembly 
The election of the President of the National Assembly occurred on 27 June at 15:00 CEST at the Palais Bourbon. The election, conducted by secret ballot, was presided over by the oldest member of the National Assembly (Bernard Brochant, LR), assisted by the six youngest deputies in the National Assembly, who serve as secretaries, namely, Ludovic Pajot, Typhanie Degois, Lénaïck Adam, Pierre Henriet, Robin Reda, and Bénédicte Peyrol. If, after two rounds, no candidate receives an absolute majority of votes, only a relative majority is required for election in the third ballot. Though the government indicated its preference for a politician from the right to take the position, a number of members of La République En Marche! voiced support for electing a president from among their ranks. Emmanuel Macron has also indicated a preference for a woman to become president of the assembly. Deputies named as ministers may not participate in the election of the president of the assembly, and their substitutes are only seated a month after the formation of the government (21 July).

Three deputies under the LREM label sought to seek the election as President of the National Assembly. After his re-election in Loire-Atlantique's 1st constituency on 18 June, the ecologist François de Rugy announced his intention to seek the presidency of the assembly, having made known his intentions to Macron. The candidacies of Sophie Errante and Brigitte Bourguignon were revealed discreetly on 23 June; both women served a single term after elected under the Socialist label in the 2012 legislative elections. LR deputy Jean-Charles Taugourdeau also presented himself as a candidate "for the form", according to the entourage of the Christian Jacob, the president of The Republicans group, in addition to Laure de la Raudière for the "constructives" group, Laurence Dumont for the "New Left" (former socialist) group, and Caroline Fiat for the FI group. The LREM candidate François de Rugy was designated by a vote of members; with 301 votes, a total of 153 votes were cast for de Rugy, 59 for Errante, 54 for Bourguignon, 32 for Philippe Folliot (whose candidacy was announced on 27 June by government spokesman Christophe Castaner), 2 blank votes, and 1 null vote. De Rugy was ultimately elected president of the assembly with 353 votes, against 94 for Taugourdeau, 34 for de La Raudière, 32 for Dumont, and 30 for Fiat, with 567 votes of which 543 were expressed.

Parliamentary groups 
Parliamentary groups had until 26 June to elect their presidents, and on 27 June political groups were officially registered within the National Assembly through the rendering of a political declaration signed by each of its members. With 7 parliamentary groups, this National Assembly would be the most fragmented since 1958.

The Democratic Movement (MoDem) sought to form its own group in the National Assembly independent of that of La République En Marche!, with more than the 15 seats required to form a parliamentary group. The French Communist Party and la France Insoumise, which failed to secure an alliance during the preceding legislative elections, also chose to form independent groups in the National Assembly, with André Chassaigne of the PCF announcing the continuation of the previous group on 21 June, including 11 of its own deputies and 4 from overseas France, but without opposition to the FI group. Jean-Luc Mélenchon's demand to impose voting discipline and an obligation to respect the program of his movement prevented the creation of a common group.

In the aftermath of the legislative elections, the split between Macron-compatible "constructives" within the Republicans (LR) and the rest of the party re-emerged. On 21 June, Thierry Solère announced the creation of a new common group in the National Assembly with the Union of Democrats and Independents (UDI) likely to contain 18 UDI and about 15 LR deputies. The formation of two parliamentary groups on the right represented a symbolic divorce to the two threads on the right (the moderates and the hardliners) and the end of the old Union for a Popular Movement (UMP) which had been created in 2002 to unite the right and centre.

On 21 June, Christian Jacob was re-elected to lead the Republicans group with 62 votes against Damien Abad with 32 votes. Olivier Faure was re-elected as president of the New Left group on 22 June with 28 votes against Delphine Batho with 3 votes, Richard Ferrand was elected president of the La République En Marche group on 24 June with 306 votes and 2 abstentions, Marc Fesneau was unanimously elected president of the Democratic Movement group on 25 June with 42 votes, Mélenchon was unanimously elected president of la France insoumise group on 27 June, the "constructives" group selected Franck Riester (LR) and Stéphane Demilly (UDI) as co-chairs, and the GDR will continue to be presided over by André Chassaigne.

Bureau of the National Assembly 
The National Assembly elected six vice presidents, three quaestors, and twelve secretaries on 30 October 2018.

Former members of National Assembly's Bureau

Presidencies of committees 
The presidencies of the eight standing committees was divided between the political groups on 29 June.

Vote of confidence 
In the vote of confidence in the new government on 4 July 2017, 370 voted in favor, 67 opposed, and 129 abstained, representing a record level of abstention and the lowest level of opposition since 1959.

Results of the legislative elections

Successive governments 
 Philippe II from 21 June 2017 until 3 July 2020 lasting 3 years, 12 days
 Castex from 3 July 2020 lasting 
 Borne government from May 2022

See also 

 2017 French legislative election
 National Assembly
 List of deputies of the 15th National Assembly of France

References

External links 
 Calendar of the opening of the 15th legislature 
 Notices and portraits of deputies 
 Changes in the composition of groups 

2017 French legislative election
National Assembly (France)
2020s in French politics